Citicorp Center may refer to:

 Citigroup Center (San Francisco), formerly Citicorp Center, US
 Citigroup Center (Chicago), formerly Citicorp Center, US
 Citigroup Center, formerly Citicorp Center, in New York City, US
 Citicorp Centre, near Fortress Hill station, Hong Kong
 Citicorp Plaza, former name of 777 Tower, Los Angeles, US

See also
 Citicorp Building, in Long Island City, Queens, New York City, US
 Citigroup Centre (disambiguation)
 Citibank Plaza, Central, Hong Kong